, born , was the fourteenth child and ninth daughter of Emperor Meiji of Japan, and the seventh child and fifth daughter of Sono Sachiko, the Emperor's fifth concubine.

Biography
Toshiko was born in Japan, the daughter of Emperor Meiji and Lady Sachiko. She held the childhood appellation "Yasu no miya" (Princess Yasu).

She married Prince Naruhiko Higashikuni on 18 May 1915. Emperor Meiji granted Prince Naruhiko the title Higashikuni-no-miya and permission to start a new branch of the imperial family before their marriage on 3 November 1906. The couple had four sons: 
; married his first cousin Princess Shigeko, the eldest daughter of Emperor Shōwa and Empress Kōjun.
; died in the Great Kantō earthquake.
; renounced imperial title and created Marquis Awata Akitsune, 1940
; relocated to Lins, São Paulo, Brazil, 1950 after being adopted and becoming the heir to Kinu, widow of Tetsusuke Tarama.

In October 1947, the Higashikuni and the other branches of the Imperial Family were divested of their titles and privileges during the American occupation of Japan and became commoners. Toshiko died on 5 March 1978, aged 81. She was the last surviving child of Emperor Meiji.

Ancestry

References 

1896 births
1978 deaths
Japanese princesses
People from Tokyo

Grand Cordons (Imperial Family) of the Order of the Precious Crown
19th-century Japanese women
19th-century Japanese people
20th-century Japanese women
20th-century Japanese people
Daughters of emperors